Epagoge melanatma is a species of moth of the family Tortricidae. It is found in Assam, India.

The wingspan is 12–15 mm. The forewings are whitish-ochreous, with a few scattered ochreous strigulae (fine streaks) sprinkled with fuscous. The hindwings are light grey, somewhat strigulated with darker, posteriorly sometimes slightly tinged with whitish-ochreous.

References

Moths described in 1908
Archipini